Anaïs Allard-Rousseau (Allard; October 31, 1904 – February 15, 1971) was a Canadian educator and social activist living in Quebec.

Biography
Anaïs Allard was born in Sainte-Monique de Nicolet. She was the sister of Jean Victor Allard. She studied music, education, philosophy and botany. In 1926, she married Arthur Rousseau, mayor of Trois-Rivières, and settled in Trois-Rivières. In 1942, she founded Les Rendez-vous artistiques, a concert society, and established the Club André-Mathieu, a series of concerts for young people. From 1952 to 1955, she was vice-president of the international federation of the Jeunesses Musicales. She taught courses in music and fine arts at the École normale du Christ-Roi, the Centre d'études universitaires and the École normale Maurice-Duplessis in Trois-Rivières. She also helped found the Conservatoire de Trois Rivières.

Death and legacy
Allard-Rousseau died in Fort-de-France, Martinique at the age of 66.

The concert hall of the Centre culturel for Trois-Rivières was named in her honour.

Awards and honours
In 1969, she was named an officer in the Order of Canada.

References 

1904 births
1971 deaths
Canadian music educators
Officers of the Order of Canada
People from Centre-du-Québec